Larry Murray is a former Major League Baseball outfielder. He played all or part of six seasons in the majors, two for the New York Yankees and one for the Oakland Athletics.

Yankees
Murray was drafted by the Yankees out of high school in the 3rd round of the 1971 Major League Baseball Draft.

A's
Murray's big break came during the early part of the  season. With Charlie Finley's dismantling of the team in full swing, the A's shipped Mike Torrez to the Yankees in exchange for Dock Ellis, Marty Perez, and Murray. While Ellis was fairly quickly shipped off himself to the Texas Rangers, Murray was given a chance to establish himself with Oakland. In 90 games, however, Murray batted just .179, with just 9 RBI in 179 at bats. He did steal 12 bases.

Even his speed seemed to desert him, as he stole just 6 bases in 12 tries, and he was soon benched in favor of Tony Armas. That would be the end of Murray's major league career.

Sources
, or Retrosheet, or Pura Pelota

1953 births
Living people
African-American baseball players
American expatriate baseball players in Canada
Baseball players from Chicago
Fort Lauderdale Yankees players
Johnson City Yankees players
Major League Baseball outfielders
New York Yankees players
Oakland Athletics players
Ogden A's players
Oneonta Yankees players
San Jose Missions players
Syracuse Chiefs players
Tigres de Aragua players
American expatriate baseball players in Venezuela
Vancouver Canadians players
West Haven Yankees players
21st-century African-American people
20th-century African-American sportspeople